77th meridian may refer to:

77th meridian east, a line of longitude east of the Greenwich Meridian
77th meridian west, a line of longitude west of the Greenwich Meridian